Tiverton is a census-designated place (CDP) in Newport County, Rhode Island, United States. The CDP encompasses the town center of Tiverton and the adjacent village of North Tiverton. The population of the CDP was 7,557 at the 2010 census.

Geography

According to the United States Census Bureau, the CDP has a total area of 6.6 square miles (17.0 km2). 4.2 square miles (10.8 km2) of it is land and 2.4 square miles (6.2 km2), or 36.63%, is water.

Culture and recreation

Soccer
During the 1920s and early 1930s North Tiverton was effectively the home of Fall River Marksmen, one of the era’s most successful soccer teams. They played their home games at  Mark's Stadium, which was based in the community. The stadium is also one of the earliest examples of a soccer-specific stadium in the United States.

Demographics

As of the census of 2000, there were 7,282 people, 3,044 households, and 2,088 families residing in the CDP. The racial makeup of the CDP was 97.79% White, 0.37% Black or African American, 0.21% Native American, 0.49% Asian, 0.07% Pacific Islander, 0.26% from other races, and 0.81% from two or more races. Hispanic or Latino of any race were 0.99% of the population.

There were 3,044 households, out of which 26.0% had children under the age of 18 living with them, 55.5% were married couples living together, 9.5% had a female householder with no husband present, and 31.4% were non-families. 27.1% of all households were made up of individuals, and 15.1% had someone living alone who was 65 years of age or older. The average household size was 2.39 and the average family size was 2.90.

In the CDP, the population was spread out, with 20.3% under the age of 18, 5.7% from 18 to 24, 28.3% from 25 to 44, 25.4% from 45 to 64, and 20.4% who were 65 years of age or older. The median age was 42 years. For every 100 females, there were 91.9 males. For every 100 females age 18 and over, there were 89.3 males.

The median income for a household in the CDP was $45,683, and the median income for a family was $57,375. Males had a median income of $39,786 versus $28,256 for females. The per capita income for the CDP was $22,238. About 3.7% of families and 5.1% of the population were below the poverty line, including 2.9% of those under age 18 and 12.2% of those age 65 or over.

References 

Villages in Rhode Island
Census-designated places in Newport County, Rhode Island
Tiverton, Rhode Island
Providence metropolitan area
Census-designated places in Rhode Island